Lake Bingo is a lake in the U.S. state of Wisconsin. Lake Bingo is a 7 acre lake located in Portage County. It has a maximum depth of 21 feet.

It is uncertain why the name "Bingo Lake" was applied to this lake, however the name dates back to at least 1895.

References

Lakes of Wisconsin
Bodies of water of Portage County, Wisconsin